is a Go competition in Japan. It is one of the seven major professional titles.

Description
The Jūdan is a Go competition used by the Japanese Nihon-Kiin and Kansai-Kiin. It was started by the Sankei Shimbun newspaper in 1962. The format is similar to the other big titles in Japan. There is a preliminary tournament that decides the challenger. Although, there is something different about the preliminary tournament. Instead of single knockout, it is a double knockout tournament. There is a losers' section where if a player loses in the preliminary, they go to the losers' section. The winner of the losers' section plays the winner of the winners' section which ultimately decides the challenger for the title. The challenger then plays against the holder in a best of 5 match.

In the Jūdan competition, if a player wins the challenger section, they are promoted to 7 dan. Winning the title gives the player a promotion to 8 dan. If the player subsequently wins another of the second tier top titles (Gosei, Judan, Oza, Tengen), the player will be promoted to 9 dan.
The competition had a predecessor, named Hayago Meijin, that ran from 1956 to 1961.

Past winners

References

External links
 Jūdan title games

Jūdan